Kris Oprisko (born in Chester, Pennsylvania) is an author who worked for Wildstorm from 1995–1999, and was one of the four founders of Idea and Design Works, LLC/IDW Publishing, where he continues to work. He has written many books such as the original Metal Gear Solid series, Case Files, the CSI series, and more. Some of the books he's written feature the art of Gabriel Hernandez and Ashley Wood, and others. He also created the Cardcaptors and Wizard in Training CCGs for Upper Deck, as well as the innovative board game/card game/miniatures game Gregory Horror Show for the same company. He currently lives in southern Spain with his family.

Books
Metal Gear Solid Volume 1
CSI: Miami Thou Shalt Not...
CSI: Dominos
Metal Gear Solid Volume 2
CSI Miami: Blood/Money
Clive Barker's the Thief of Always: Book 3
Clive Barker's the Thief of Always: Book 2
Clive Barker's the Thief of Always: Book 1
Underworld Official Movie Adaptation
Underworld: Red in Tooth & Claw 3-issue miniseries
Robot Galaxy #1 & 2
Wizard in Training
Gridiron Giants #1&2
Saw 2
Turistas
Transformers Official Movie Adaptation
Hyde (with Steve Niles)
Bounty Hunter promo comic
Heavy Metal "Tusk" story
Resident Evil magazine #1-6
Resident Evil Code Veronica miniseries
Resident Evil Fire & Ice #1-4
Future Cop: LAPD promo comic
WildStorm Extreme Sports comic

IP Development 
Jigsaw Man
CVO Animated
Warhawk 2 videogame cut-scene script
ATV Offroad Fury videogame cut-scene script

Trading Cards 
For WildStorm: Wetworks, Art of Chiodo, Avengelyne I & II, Gen13 1 & II, WildStorm Set I & II, DV8, WildStorm Archives, All-Image, Best of WildStorm, Photoblast, WildStorm Lingerie, Marvel vs. WildStorm, Spawn '96
For Upper Deck: Hulk, Spider-Man 2, Disney Classics-Mickey Mouse, Disney Classics-Donald Duck, Disney Classics-Winnie the Pooh, The Lion King

Collectible Card Games 
Created for Upper Deck: Gregory Horror Show, CardCaptors, SpongeBob SquarePants, Wizard in Training, Lego Bionicle McDonald's Happy Meal game, NFL Football, MLB Baseball, NHL Hockey
Card Localization for Upper Deck: Digimon (initial US release), Yu-Gi-Oh! (localization of US rules and first 1300 US cards)
For Bandai: Gundam M.S. War, Knights of the Zodiac, Navia Dratp, Teen Titans, Ben10

References 

Year of birth missing (living people)
Living people
American male writers